The General American Investors Company, Inc. is a closed-end fund that manages a global portfolio of investments, consisting mainly of United States securities, and also some international and private securities.

History

The General American Investors investment trust was launched in 1927 under the sponsorship of Lazard Frères and Lehman Brothers.  In its first year of operation, it earned $1.1 million.  In September 1928, Lazard Frères and Lehman Brothers launched a second fund, named the Second General American Investors Company.  In August 1928, the two funds merged, to form the current General American Investors Company, with Lazard Frères and Lehman Brothers underwriting the $40 million deal.

The early years of the Great Depression were difficult for the fund, but the fund recovered as the 1930s progressed.  The fund had assets valued at $15 million in 1932; at $23.1 million in 1933; and $30.1 million in 1935.  Assets dropped to $24.7 million in 1937; $30 million in 1939; then dropped to $25.5 million in 1943; dropping slightly to $25.3 million in 1945.

Leadership

Chairmen of the General American Investors Company

Frank Altschul, 1948-1961 
Arthur G. Altschul, 1961-1995
Lawrence B. Buttenwieser, 1995-2007
Spencer Davidson, 2007–Present

Presidents / Portfolio Managers of the Fund

Frank Altschul, 1927-1948
Harold F. Linder, 1948-1955
Harry G. Friedman, 1955-1961
Malcolm B. Smith, 1961-1989
William J. Gedale, 1989-1995
Spencer Davidson, 1995–Present

References

Financial services companies established in 1927
Companies listed on the New York Stock Exchange
Investment companies of the United States